Statistics of Belgian League in season 1983–84.

Overview

It was performed by 18 teams, and K.S.K. Beveren won the championship.

League standings

Results

Top scorers

References

Belgian Pro League seasons
Belgian
1